Kakadeo is a locality in Kanpur, Uttar Pradesh, India. 
Kakadeo has a very deep history. It was ruled by the Chandela dynasty for hundreds of years and is known for temples built by the Chandel Thakurs, some which are centuries old. Kakadeo was also known as village of temples (mandiron ka gaav) in early days. Two of the most famous temples are the temple of 'Kaka Baba', after whom Kakadeo is named.

In modern times, Kakadeo is one of the posh areas of the city of Kanpur and is now known for coaching institutes for various competitive exams.   
It is the second biggest center after Kota for Coaching Institutes for various entrance examinations for different fields, primarily Engineering and Medicine. Coaching institutes such as  UPTU, IIT-JEE, AIPMT, UPCPMT, AIIMS, SSC, Banking, Dronacharya EduAcademy etc. are located here.

References

Education in Kanpur
Neighbourhoods in Kanpur